Cocco is the name of a Japanese singer. Other notable people with the name Cocco include:

 Adelasia Cocco (1885–1983), one of the first female doctors in Italy
 Anastasio Cocco (1799–1854), Italian naturalist
 Andrea Cocco (born 1986), Italian footballer
 Daisy Cocco De Filippis (born 1949), Dominican-American academic and administrator
 Davide Cocco Palmieri (1632–1711), Roman Catholic prelate from Italy
 Giovanni Cocco (1921–2007), Italian weightlifter
 Jorge Cocco Santángelo (born 1936), Argentine painter and academic
 Miguel Cocco (1946–2009), Dominican businessman and politician
 Patricia Cocco (born 1971), Brazilian volleyballer
 Roberto Cocco (born 1977), Italian kickboxer and boxer
 Victorio Cocco (born 1946), Argentine footballer

See also

 
 Cocco Bill, Italian comics character
 Di Cocco, a list of people with the surname Di Cocco
 Francesco Cocco-Ortu (1842–1929), Italian politician